is a railway station in Shinjuku, Tokyo, Japan, operated by the private railway operator Seibu Railway.

The station is located approximately 420 meters (460 yards) by foot from Shinjuku Station. It is part of the Shinjuku Prince Hotel and Seibu Shinjuku PePe shopping complex, with the ticket machines and platforms located on the second-floor level. The main entrance is located at the southern end, and a smaller "North entrance" is located at the north end of the station.

Platforms
The station has three elevated platforms serving three tracks. Platform 1 is normally used for all-stations "Local" services, platform 2 is normally used for "Limited express" and "Rapid express" services, and platform 3 is normally used for "Rapid", "Express", and "Semi express" services.

History
The station opened on March 25, 1952, when the Seibu Shinjuku Line was extended south from Takadanobaba Station. It was initially intended to be a temporary station until the line could be extended all the way to Shinjuku Station. Seibu planned to use right-of-way south of Seibu-Shinjuku Station which had originally been used for a streetcar line connecting Shinjuku to Ogikubo. In the late 1950s and early 1960s, Seibu planned to extend the line to a new terminal on the second floor of the building now known as Lumine Est on the east side of Shinjuku Station, but this plan was eventually scrapped due to insufficient space to handle trains longer than six cars. The modern 25-story station building was completed in 1977, effectively ending all plans to extend the line to Shinjuku Station.

In the late 1980s, Seibu drew up a plan to build a 12.8 km (8 mile) underground line for express trains between Seibu-Shinjuku and Kami-Shakujii, following the existing line but stopping only at Takadanobaba. The plan called for a new underground station between Seibu-Shinjuku and the Metro Promenade. The plan was postponed indefinitely in 1995 due to costs (an initial estimate of 160 billion yen ballooned to 300 billion yen) and a decline in passenger ridership versus previous projections. Seibu was also a bidder to acquire the former JR freight terminal site in 1989, where they planned to build a new underground terminal; Takashimaya won the bid and constructed the Takashimaya Times Square complex on the site.

Station numbering was introduced on all Seibu Railway lines during fiscal 2012, with Seibu-Shinjuku Station becoming "SS01".

Passenger statistics
In fiscal 2013, the station was the third busiest on the Seibu network with an average of 175,244 passengers daily.

The passenger figures for previous years are as shown below.

Surrounding area
The station is located adjacent to the Kabukichō entertainment district in Shinjuku. It lies approximately 500 m north of the main Shinjuku Station complex, and is connected via the "Subnade" underground shopping street.

Other points of interest in the vicinity include:
 Shinjuku Ward Office
 Shinjuku Golden Gai
 Hanazono Shrine
 Shinjuku-Nishiguchi Station (Toei Oedo Line)
 Ohkubo Hospital

References

External links

 Seibu-Shinjuku Station information (Seibu Railway) 

Railway stations in Tokyo
Railway stations in Japan opened in 1952
Seibu Shinjuku Line
Stations of Seibu Railway